In the 2006–07 season, the Southern Illinois Salukis men's basketball team played in the Missouri Valley Conference and took part in the Missouri Valley tournament (reaching the West Regional semifinal) and the NCAA tournament. The team won 29 of its matches and lost 7.

Recruiting

Roster

Schedule

|-
!colspan=8| Regular season

|-
!colspan=8| Missouri Valley Tournament

|-
!colspan=8| NCAA Tournament

References

Southern Illinois Salukis men's basketball seasons
Southern Illinois
Southern Illinois Salukis men's basketball
Southern Illinois Salukis men's basketball
Southern Illinois